The following is a list of teams that, at one time, played in the AF2.  This does not include teams in AF2 when the Board of Directors formed the New AFL in 2010.

Timeline

External links 
ArenaFan Online's af2 Historical Teams List

AF2 teams
Arena Football League lists